The Temptation of Sarah Jane Smith is the fifth serial of the second series of the British science fiction television series The Sarah Jane Adventures. It first aired in two weekly parts on CBBC on 17 and 24 November 2008.

In the story, Sarah Jane Smith is emotionally manipulated by a malicious chaos-causing entity called The Trickster into preventing the accidental death of her parents in the past, in order to open a fault in time and bring chaos upon the Earth.

Plot
Under the command of the Trickster, Krislok of the Graske tricks Sarah Jane and Luke into following him through a time fissure to the village of Foxgrove on the day in 1951 in which Sarah Jane's parents abandoned her as a baby by the side of the road shortly before being killed in a car accident. Ignoring Luke's warning that changing time is not a good idea, she sabotages her parents' car with her sonic lipstick to prevent them from leaving. Sarah Jane and Luke go through the time fissure again and discover that present-day London has been destroyed. The Trickster then appears before Sarah Jane and mockingly thanks her for all she has done for him.

In the present, the Verron puzzle box Maria used lights up, and Clyde and Rani are transported to London in an alternative timeline in which the Trickster physically entered the world in 1951 and destroyed it because Sarah Jane broke a faultline in a weak point in time located in the village. In the present, the last of humanity is enslaved by Krislok, and are mining resources so that the Trickster may create a ship and extend his reach to the rest of the universe. Clyde and Rani implore Krislok to help them restore the original timeline but he explains that if he did the Trickster would punish him; his life had been saved by the Trickster in return for eternal servitude. Clyde promises Krislok that if he helps them get back to Sarah Jane, they will give him the puzzle box to free him from the Trickster.

In the past, while the Trickster has still not yet manifested, Sarah Jane repairs the car. Overhearing what Rani tells Sarah Jane about the car, and noticing their touch instantly withers any organic life they hold, Sarah Jane's parents realise driving off in the car will stop the disaster. After telling their daughter how proud they are of her, they both enter the car and drive off. The Trickster fades away; while Sarah Jane could not convince her parents to die, the plan never considered that her parents would willingly sacrifice themselves to save the world. Back in the restored present, Clyde gives Krislok the puzzle box as promised, and Krislok celebrates his freedom.

Continuity
Flashbacks to the events of "Whatever Happened to Sarah Jane?" are shown and Yasmin Paige makes an uncredited archive footage appearance in these as Maria Jackson.  The Trickster appears again in The Wedding of Sarah Jane Smith, opposite the Doctor.

Notes

References

External links

The official BBC The Sarah Jane Adventures website
Press Pack information regarding The Temptation of Sarah Jane Smith at the BBC Press Office website

The Sarah Jane Adventures episodes
Films with screenplays by Gareth Roberts (writer)
2008 British television episodes
Television episodes about time travel
Fiction set in 1951
Television episodes set in the 1950s